The 1947 World Table Tennis Championships – Swaythling Cup (men's team) was the 14th edition of the men's team championship.  

Czechoslovakia won the gold medal defeating the United States 5–2 in the final. Austria and France won bronze medals by virtue of finishing second in their groups.

Swaythling Cup table

Pool A

+ withdrew

Pool B

Final

See also
 List of World Table Tennis Championships medalists

References

-